Emil Gustafson i Vimmerby  (1887–1976) was a Swedish politician. He was a member of the Centre Party.

References
This article was initially translated from the Swedish Wikipedia article.

Centre Party (Sweden) politicians
1887 births
1976 deaths